"Am I Forgiven" is a song by British female singer-songwriter Rumer. Produced by award-winning UK TV and musical composer Steve Brown, it was released as the third single from her debut album Seasons of My Soul on April 29, 2011.

Music video
A music video to accompany the release of "Am I Forgiven" was first released onto YouTube on 11 February 2011 at a total length of three minutes and thirty-five seconds.

Track listings

Chart performance

Release history

References

2011 singles
2010 songs
Rumer (musician) songs
Songs written by Rumer (musician)
Atlantic Records singles